Luka Bebić (born 21 August 1937) is a former Croatian politician who served as Speaker of the Croatian Parliament from 11 January 2008 to 22 December 2011. He is a member of the Croatian Democratic Union (HDZ) and has been a representative in the Croatian Parliament since the nation's independence in 1991, being elected into office six consecutive times.

He graduated from the University of Sarajevo with a degree in agronomics. He also served briefly as Minister of Defence in 1991.

References

External links

 Sabor page

1937 births
Croatian Democratic Union politicians
Defence ministers of Croatia
Living people
People from Kula Norinska
Representatives in the modern Croatian Parliament
Speakers of the Croatian Parliament
University of Sarajevo alumni